is a crossover third-person shooter game developed by Fly-System in 2008. The game features characters from Magical Girl Lyrical Nanoha, Magic Knight Rayearth, Cardcaptor Sakura, Slayers, and Mahōjin Guru Guru.

Gameplay

Magical Battle Arena is primarily an arena third-person shooter where the players choose a character and try and defeat everyone else. The game offers the Story, VS, and Survival modes, the Network Play up to four players, and the Mission Mode, where specific requirements are needed in order to succeed in the mission, given the grade of how well one did.

Each character has basic attacks (both ranged and melee), a defense power, and a sprint. In addition to each of these basic skills each character has their own special attacks, the effects of which differ greatly between characters. The battlefield where this takes place is in the airspace above a given map. Some places are naught but open area, whereas others may provide cover and obstructions, usually in the form of tall buildings or geological formations. The characters all share a common control scheme, including frequent use of 'charging' attacks.

Plot
The plot of the Story mode, like many fighting games, is mainly a framing device that serves mostly to explain how such a diverse number of characters would all be brought together. The basic, plot follows, though the specifics differ depending on which character has been chosen to play through, though all tell essentially the same story, if from different points of view.

Every millennia, in order to maintain the cosmic balance of magic amongst the multiverse a tournament is held in order to find the greatest, most powerful mage. The participants in this tournament are all kidnapped from their world of origin and transported to a separate dimension. All are told they must fight and win in order to return home. Along the way one competitor the character comes across is their friend (and/or companion). They first must fight, and when the character succeeds in defeating them, they join forces. Once the character and their companion have faced and defeated all the other competitors, they face the apparent host of this tournament, and are told the truth of the fighting. In order to maintain the cosmic balance of magic among the multiverse, the strongest and most powerful mage must be made a teosu - sacrificed to run the "magical tuning system Kyrios". The last duty of a teosu is to select the next one, and the tournament was the most effective way of finding who would become the next. After these characters fight, it is decided that they will all work together to find an alternate solution to maintain the balance, though the plan is never clarified.

Characters
From Cardcaptor Sakura: Sakura Kinomoto
From Magic Knight Rayearth: Hikaru, Umi, and Fuu (one character)
From Magical Girl Lyrical Nanoha A's: Nanoha Takamachi; Fate Testarossa; Hayate Yagami; Vita
From Magical Girl Lyrical Nanoha Strikers: Takamachi Nanoha StS; Fate T. Harlaown StS; Gadget Drone
From Magical Circle Guru Guru: Kukuri; Kita Kita Oyaji
From Slayers: Lina Inverse; Naga the Serpent; Lord of Nightmares
From Magical Girl Kirara & Sarara ~Dioskroi Of Starlit Sky~: Hoshizora Kirara; Hoshizora Sarara
Original characters: Lulu Gelad; Nowel Diastasis

New characters released in the Lyrical Pack (update to 1.50 from 1.05): Vita, Yagami Hayate, Takamachi Nanoha StS, Lord of Nightmares, and Kita Kita Oyaji are not available in Story mode.( Update to 1.70 from 1.50): adds Fate T. Harlaown StS from Magical Girl Lyrical Nanoha StrikerS, and Hikaru, Umi, and Fuu from Magic Knight Rayearth (they play as one character and the player can swap between them using special moves) but they are also not playable in Story mode.

Release
The demo was released at Comiket 73. The full began selling in Japan at Comiket 74 on August 17, 2008. Its expansion, Lyrical Pack, was released at Comiket 75. A stand-alone version of the base game and previous expansions was published by Area-Zero as Magical Battle Arena: Complete.

Reception

External links
 Official website 

2008 video games
Doujin video games
Japan-exclusive video games
Crossover video games
Multiplayer and single-player video games
Science fantasy video games
Cardcaptor Sakura
Magic Knight Rayearth
Magical Girl Lyrical Nanoha
Magical girl video games
Slayers video games
Third-person shooters
Video game franchises
Video games based on anime and manga
Video games developed in Japan
Windows games
Windows-only games